Microbial phylogenetics is the study of the manner in which various groups of microorganisms are genetically related. This helps to trace their evolution. To study these relationships biologists rely on comparative genomics, as physiology and comparative anatomy are not possible methods.

History

1960s–1970s 
Microbial phylogenetics emerged as a field of study in the 1960s, scientists started to create genealogical trees based on differences in the order of amino acids of proteins and nucleotides of genes instead of using comparative anatomy and physiology.

One of the most important figures in the early stage of this field is Carl Woese, who in his researches, focused on Bacteria, looking at RNA instead of proteins. More specifically, he decided to compare the small subunit ribosomal RNA (16rRNA) oligonucleotides. Matching oligonucleotides in different bacteria could be compared to one another to determine how closely the organisms were related. In 1977, after collecting and comparing 16s rRNA fragments for almost 200 species of bacteria, Woese and his team in 1977 concluded that Archaebacteria were not part of Bacteria but completely independent organisms.

1980s–1990s 
In the 1980s microbial phylogenetics went into its golden age, as the techniques for sequencing RNA and DNA improved greatly. For example, comparison of the nucleotide sequences of whole genes was facilitated by the development of the means to clone DNA, making possible to create many copies of sequences from minute samples. Of incredible impact for the microbial phylogenetics was the invention of the polymerase chain reaction (PCR). All these new techniques led to the formal proposal of the three domains of life: Bacteria, Archaea (Woese himself proposed this name to replace the old nomination of Archaebacteria), and Eukarya, arguably one of the key passage in the history of taxonomy.

One of the intrinsic problems of studying microbial organisms was the dependence of the studies from pure culture in a laboratory. Biologists tried to overcome this limitation by sequencing rRNA genes obtained from DNA isolated directly from the environment. This technique made possible to fully appreciate that bacteria, not only to have the greatest diversity but to constitute the greatest biomass on earth.

In the late 1990s sequencing of genomes from various microbial organisms started and by 2005, 260 complete genomes had been sequenced resulting in the classification of 33 eucaryotes, 206 eubacteria, and 21 archeons.

2000s 
In the early 2000s, scientists started creating phylogenetic trees based not on rRNA, but on other genes with different function (for example the gene for the enzyme RNA polymerase). The resulting genealogies differed greatly from the ones based on the rRNA. These gene histories were so different between them that the only hypothesis that could explain these divergences was a major influence of horizontal gene transfer (HGT), a mechanism which permits a bacterium to acquire one or more genes from a completely unrelated organism. HGT explains why similarities and differences in some genes have to be carefully studied before being used as a measure of genealogical relationship for microbial organisms.

Studies aimed at understanding the widespread of HGT suggested that the ease with which genes are transferred among bacteria made impossible to apply ‘the biological species concept’ for them.

Phylogenetic representation 
Since Darwin, every phylogeny for every organism has been represented in the form of a tree. Nonetheless, due to the great role that HGT plays for microbes some evolutionary microbiologists suggested abandoning this classical view in favor of a representation of genealogies more closely resembling a web, also known as network. However, there are some issues with this network representation, such as the inability to precisely establish the donor organism for a HGT event and the difficulty to determine the correct path across organisms when multiple HGT events happened. Therefore, there is not still a consensus between biologists on which representation is a better fit for the microbial world.

See also
Comparative genomics
Phylogenomics
Multilocus sequence typing
 Bacterial taxonomy
 Computational phylogenetics
 History of molecular evolution
 Molecular phylogenetics
 Phylogenetics

References

Phylogenetics
Microorganisms
Eukaryotic microbiology